Aulus Caecina Paetus (died AD 42) was a Roman senator, who was condemned to death for his role in the revolt of Lucius Arruntius Camillus Scribonianus against the emperor Claudius. He was suffect consul in the nundinium of September to December 37 with Gaius Caninius Rebilus as his colleague.

When the sentence was handed down, it was determined that he would be allowed to kill himself rather than face the emperor's wrath. However, when the time came, Paetus wavered in his resolution to do so. His wife Arria stabbed herself first in order to give him the courage to do this and handed him the dagger saying "Non dolet, Paete!" ("It doesn't hurt, Paetus!")

Paetus and Arria had several children together. Those who survived to adulthood included:
 Gaius Laecanius Bassus Caecina Paetus, suffect consul in 70, and adopted by Gaius Laecanius Bassus;
 Caecina Arria, wife of Publius Clodius Thrasea Paetus.

References

Further reading
 Georges Duby, Michelle Perrot, Pauline Schmitt. A History of Women in the West, Volume I. Belknap Press. 2000

External links
Women's life in Greece and Rome 

42 deaths
1st-century Romans
Ancient Romans who committed suicide
Paetus, Aulus
Suffect consuls of Imperial Rome
Suicides by sharp instrument in Italy
Year of birth unknown